Barnabás Bese (born 6 May 1994) is a Hungarian professional footballer who plays as a right back for Fehérvár in the Nemzeti Bajnokság I.

Club career

MTK Budapest
On 26 May 2012, Bese played his first match in the MTK Budapest against Szigetszentmiklósi TK on the 29th match day of the 2011–12 Nemzeti Bajnokság II season.

On 23 November 2012, Bese played his first match in the first league (Nemzeti Bajnokság I) against Kaposvár on the 16th match day of the 2012–13 Nemzeti Bajnokság I season.

He scored his first goal on 3 August 2013 in the Nemzeti Bajnokság I against Diósgyőri VTK on the 2nd match day of the 2013–14 Nemzeti Bajnokság I season. His goal was the equalizer in a 2–2 draw at the DVTK Stadion in Miskolc, Hungary.

Le Havre
On 19 August 2016, Bese signed for Ligue 2 club Le Havre AC on a four-year contract.

On 27 August 2016, Bese played his first match in Le Havre against Red Star F.C. on the first match day of the 2016–17 Ligue 2 season.

International career
Bese was selected for the Hungary national team's Euro 2016 squad.

He played in the last group match in a 3–3 draw against Portugal at the Parc Olympique Lyonnais, Lyon on 22 June 2016.

Career statistics

Club

International

References

External links
Profile at HLSZ 
Profile at MLSZ 

1994 births
Living people
Footballers from Budapest
Hungarian footballers
Association football forwards
Hungary international footballers
Hungary youth international footballers
Hungary under-21 international footballers
UEFA Euro 2016 players
MTK Budapest FC players
Le Havre AC players
Oud-Heverlee Leuven players
Fehérvár FC players
Nemzeti Bajnokság I players
Ligue 2 players
Belgian Pro League players
Hungarian expatriate footballers
Expatriate footballers in Belgium
Expatriate footballers in France